
Year 320 BC was a year of the pre-Julian Roman calendar. At the time, it was known as the Year of the Consulship of Cursor and Philo (or, less frequently, year 434 Ab urbe condita). The denomination 320 BC for this year has been used since the early medieval period, when the Anno Domini calendar era became the prevalent method in Europe for naming years.

Events 
 By place 

 Macedonian Empire 
 Alexander the Great's various generals control different parts of Alexander's empire. Ptolemy controls Egypt, Seleucus controls Babylon and Syria, Antipater and his son Cassander control Macedon and Greece, Antigonus controls Phrygia and other parts of Asia Minor, Lysimachus controls Thrace and Pergamum and Eumenes controls the Cappadocia and Pontus areas.
 Judea and Syria are annexed by Ptolemy and he gives Judea a large measure of self-government.
 Eudemus makes himself master of the territories of the Indian king Porus, and treacherously puts that monarch to death.

 By topic 

 Biology 
 Theophrastus begins the systematic study of botany.

 Demography 
 Alexandria in Macedonian Egypt becomes the largest city of the world, taking over the lead from Babylon in Macedonian Babylonia.

Births 
 Timocharis of Alexandria, Greek astronomer responsible for the first recorded observation of Mercury and the first star catalogue (d. 260 BC)
 Bindusara, the heir to the throne of the Mauryan Empire, is born. (d. 272 BC)

Deaths 
 Anaximenes of Lampsacus, Greek rhetorician and historian (b. c. 380 BC)
 Menaechmus, Greek mathematician and geometer

 Zoilus, Greek grammarian, cynic philosopher and literary critic from Amphipolis in Macedon (b. c. 400 BC)

References